Charles B. Garrigus (June 13, 1914 Benton, Illinois  – October 4, 2000) was an American poet and professor who was California Poet Laureate from 1966 to 2000. He also served in the California State Assembly for 33rd district from 1959 to 1967.

He lived in Reedley, California and was professor of English at Reedley College.

References

External links

 

1914 births
2000 deaths
Poets Laureate of California
20th-century American poets
Poets from California
People from Benton, Illinois
People from Reedley, California
Republican Party members of the California State Assembly